The Leonardo Royal Hotel Birmingham  is a hotel on Broad Street, Birmingham, England. 

The structure was originally an office building, the Chamberlain Tower. Built using concrete cladding and steel joists, it was part of the plan to redevelop Birmingham in the 1960s. Construction commenced in 1974 and was completed the following year, to a design by Ian Fraser of John Roberts & Partners. It is one of the tallest buildings on Broad Street and forms a prominent part of the city skyline when viewed from the south. It is an example of Brutalist architecture in Birmingham, with other similar examples being Birmingham Central Library and New Street Station Signal Box.

The building was converted to a hotel in 1998, at a cost of £12.5m, and opened as the Chamberlain Tower Hotel on 1 February 1999 The hotel has 445 rooms, making it the largest hotel in Birmingham city centre. On the ground floor is a pub and a restaurant. It was bought by the Jurys Inns hotel chain in 2001 for £42 million and renamed Jurys Inn Birmingham. In April 2022, the Fattal Hotel Group announced that all Jurys Inn Hotels would be rebranded as Leonardo Hotels. The hotel was renamed Leonardo Royal Hotel Birmingham on 19 December 2022.

See also 
List of tallest buildings and structures in Birmingham

References

Hotels in Birmingham, West Midlands
Hotels established in 1999